Oreobates discoidalis, also known as the Tucuman robber frog, is a species of frog in the family Strabomantidae.
It is found on the eastern flanks of the Andes in northern Argentina and Bolivia.
Its natural habitat is subtropical or tropical moist montane forest.
It is threatened by habitat loss.

References

discoidalis
Amphibians of Argentina
Amphibians of Bolivia
Amphibians of the Andes
Taxa named by Mario Giacinto Peracca
Amphibians described in 1895
Taxonomy articles created by Polbot